Tinaminyssus is a genus of mites in the family Rhinonyssidae. There are more than 60 described species in Tinaminyssus.

Species
These 68 species belong to the genus Tinaminyssus:

 Tinaminyssus alexfaini (Amaral, 1967)
 Tinaminyssus alisteri (Wilson, 1964)
 Tinaminyssus angustus (Wilson, 1966)
 Tinaminyssus aprosmicti (Domrow, 1964)
 Tinaminyssus baforti (Fain, 1963)
 Tinaminyssus belopolskii (Bregetova, 1950)
 Tinaminyssus bubulci (Zumpt & Till, 1955)
 Tinaminyssus buteonis (Fain, 1956)
 Tinaminyssus camargoi (Amaral, 1962)
 Tinaminyssus carapachibeyus Dusbábek, 1969
 Tinaminyssus castroae (Amaral, 1963)
 Tinaminyssus chiarellii Amaral & Baquer, 1963
 Tinaminyssus columbae (Crossley, 1950)
 Tinaminyssus crypturelli Fain, 1967
 Tinaminyssus cunhai (Amaral, 1963)
 Tinaminyssus daceloae (Domrow, 1965)
 Tinaminyssus egrettae (Butenko, 1984)
 Tinaminyssus elani (Fain, 1966)
 Tinaminyssus epileus (Wilson, 1964)
 Tinaminyssus geopeliae (Fain, 1964)
 Tinaminyssus geotrygoni (Dusbábek, 1969)
 Tinaminyssus gerschi (Feider & Mironescu, 1974)
 Tinaminyssus gourae (Wilson, 1964)
 Tinaminyssus halcyonus (Domrow, 1965)
 Tinaminyssus hirtus (Wilson, 1966)
 Tinaminyssus ixobrychi (Fain, 1956)
 Tinaminyssus ixoreus (Strandtmann & Clifford, 1962)
 Tinaminyssus juxtamelloi Pence & Canaris, 1976
 Tinaminyssus kakatuae (Domrow, 1964)
 Tinaminyssus macropygiae (Wilson, 1966)
 Tinaminyssus malayi (Fain & Nadchatram, 1962)
 Tinaminyssus marciae (Amaral, 1966)
 Tinaminyssus megaloprepiae Domrow, 1969
 Tinaminyssus melloi (Castro, 1948)
 Tinaminyssus metropeliae (Fain, 1972)
 Tinaminyssus milvi (Fain, 1962)
 Tinaminyssus minisetosum (Butenko, 1984)
 Tinaminyssus myristicivorae Domrow, 1967
 Tinaminyssus navajasi (Pereira & Castro, 1949)
 Tinaminyssus neoixobrychi Pence, 1972
 Tinaminyssus ocyphabus (Domrow, 1965)
 Tinaminyssus oenae (Fain, 1963)
 Tinaminyssus peleiae (Wilson, 1966)
 Tinaminyssus phabus (Domrow, 1965)
 Tinaminyssus phalliger (Fain, 1965)
 Tinaminyssus phassae (Wilson, 1966)
 Tinaminyssus prionituri (Wilson, 1966)
 Tinaminyssus pteroclesi (Fain, 1963)
 Tinaminyssus ptilinopi (Wilson, 1964)
 Tinaminyssus sartbaevi (Butenko, 1984)
 Tinaminyssus saucerottiae (Fain & Aitken, 1967)
 Tinaminyssus schoutedeni (Fain, 1956)
 Tinaminyssus senotrusovae (Butenko, 1984)
 Tinaminyssus serraoi (Castro, 1948)
 Tinaminyssus squamosus (Vitzthum, 1935)
 Tinaminyssus streptopeliae (Fain, 1962)
 Tinaminyssus streptopelioides (Butenko, 1984)
 Tinaminyssus tanysipterae (Wilson, 1966)
 Tinaminyssus tetae (Wilson, 1964)
 Tinaminyssus tinamicola (Fain, 1963)
 Tinaminyssus trappi (Pereira & Castro, 1949)
 Tinaminyssus treronis (Fain, 1956)
 Tinaminyssus triangulus (Strandtmann, 1961)
 Tinaminyssus trichoglossi (Domrow, 1964)
 Tinaminyssus turturi (Fain, 1962)
 Tinaminyssus welchi Domrow, 1967
 Tinaminyssus zenaidurae (Crossley, 1952)
 Tinaminyssus zumpti (Fain, 1960)

References

Rhinonyssidae
Articles created by Qbugbot